Leonard Henryk Andrzejewski (1 March 1924 – 18 October 1997) was a Polish actor. He appeared in the  television series Ballada o Januszku in 1988-89. He was a winner of the Medal of the 10th Anniversary of People's Poland in 1955 and the Meritorious Activist of Culture in 1977.

References

Polish male actors
1924 births
1997 deaths
20th-century Polish male actors
Recipient of the Meritorious Activist of Culture badge